Eucalyptus mckieana, commonly known as McKie's stringybark, is a species of tree that is endemic to New South Wales. It has rough, stringy bark on the trunk and branches, lance-shaped to curved adult leaves, flower buds in groups of between seven and eleven, white flowers and cup-shaped, barrel-shaped or hemispherical fruit.

Description
It is usually straight-trunked with reddish brown stringy or fibrous bark on the trunk to the ends of the branches. Flowering has been recorded in April and July and the flowers are white.

Taxonomy and naming
Eucalyptus mckieana was first formally described in 1930 by William Blakely in Proceedings of the Linnean Society of New South Wales from specimens collected on the upper part of the Gwydir River. The specific epithet honours "Ernest Norman McKie, B.A., Presbyterian Minister at Guyra, N.S.W., who, by his intimate field and botanical knowledge of the New England Eucalypts, has helped in the elucidation of this and other species of this most economic genus."

Distribution and habitat
McKie's stringybark grows in dry forest on low hills and gentle slopes on the drier western side of the New England Tableland between Torrington and Bendemeer.

Conservation status
This eucalypt is classified as "vulnerable" under the Australian Government Environment Protection and Biodiversity Conservation Act 1999 and the New South Wales Government Biodiversity Conservation Act 2016. Although some populations are conserved in a national park and nature reserve, most occur on private property. The main threats to the species include land clearing, timber harvesting, firewood collection and road works.

See also 

 Eucalyptus × tinghaensis, believed to be a hybrid of E. caliginosa and possibly E. mckieana.

References

mckieana
Myrtales of Australia
Flora of New South Wales
Trees of Australia
Plants described in 1934
Taxa named by William Blakely